Upper Braes is one of the nine wards used to elect members of the Falkirk Council. It elects four Councillors.

Councillors

Election Results

2022 Election
2022 Falkirk Council election

2017 Election
2017 Falkirk Council election

2012 Election
2012 Falkirk Council election

2007 Election
2007 Falkirk Council election

References

Wards of Falkirk